Francisco Edson Moreira da Silva, known simply as Edinho (born 8 August 1994), is a Brazilian professional footballer who plays as an attacking midfielder for Sport, on loan from Fortaleza.

Career
Born in Baturité, Ceará, Edinho joined Fortaleza EC aged 17 and was promoted to the senior team in 2013. He was a starter in the 2014 Série C campaign making 16 appearances and scoring three goals. In 2014, he was sold to Tombense and in the two following years had a series of loan spells at Avaí, Paysandu and Ituano, before joining Guarani in 2016.

In July 2017, Edinho joined CSA on loan from Guarani, where he won the 2017 Série C title.

In 2018, Edinho returned to Fortaleza and played a major role in the team during the first half of the season, helping them get to the top of the Série B table by the 11th round with two goals and five assists.

On 28 June 2018, Edinho joined Atlético Mineiro on a five-year deal. He made his debut for Atlético, which also was his Série A debut, on 19 July 2018, in a 2–0 away loss to Grêmio.

In January 2019, Edinho rejoined Fortaleza on loan for the season.

Career statistics

Honours
CSA
Campeonato Brasileiro Série C: 2017

References

External links

Profile at Atlético Mineiro site

1994 births
Living people
People from Baturité
Brazilian footballers
Association football midfielders
Campeonato Brasileiro Série A players
Campeonato Brasileiro Série B players
Campeonato Brasileiro Série C players
K League 2 players
Fortaleza Esporte Clube players
Tombense Futebol Clube players
Avaí FC players
Paysandu Sport Club players
Ituano FC players
Guarani FC players
Mogi Mirim Esporte Clube players
Centro Sportivo Alagoano players
Clube Atlético Mineiro players
Daejeon Hana Citizen FC players
Esporte Clube Juventude players
Sport Club do Recife players
Brazilian expatriate footballers
Brazilian expatriate sportspeople in South Korea
Expatriate footballers in South Korea
Sportspeople from Ceará